ICGS Samudra Paheredar is an Indian Pollution Control Vessel (PCV).

The ship was commissioned by then Chief of the Naval Staff Admiral Nirmal Verma in July 2012 in Gujarat. The vessel takes care of the east coast of India and can go up to a speed of 21 knots.  It is the second pollution control vessel of India (first being ICGS Samudra Prahari) and was built by  ABG Ship Yard Pvt. Ltd. In 2020, the ICGS Samudra Paheredar visited Muscat, Doha and Riyadh and Dubai. In Dubai, the vessel underwent joint training with UAE navy.

References 

Ships of the Indian Coast Guard